Curse of the Azure Bonds is an adventure module published in 1989 for the Dungeons & Dragons fantasy role-playing game.

Plot summary
Curse of the Azure Bonds is a Forgotten Realms adventure scenario based on the computer game Curse of the Azure Bonds, in which the player characters seek to remove magical tattoos from their bodies; this ties in with the novel Azure Bonds as well.

Publication history
FRC2 Curse of the Azure Bonds was written by Jeff Grubb and published by TSR in 1989 as a 96-page book.

Reception
Curse of the Azure Bonds is a Gamer's Choice award-winner.

Reviews

References

Forgotten Realms adventures
Role-playing game supplements introduced in 1989